The Riyuexing Cup was a Go competition held in 2005.

Outline
The Riyuexing Cup was a team tournament, in which two countries compete. The countries were China and South Korea. Each country selected five players. Each Go player then played against the every other player of the opposing team. The country with the most wins would be crowned the champion.

There would be five rounds of matches. China led 11–9 in the first four rounds. The fifth and final round was postponed and never held.

Results 
First round (Beijing, 4 February 2005)

Second round (Beijing, 5 February 2005)

Third round (Seoul, 12 May 2005)

Fourth round (Seoul, 13 May 2005)

References

International Go competitions
2005 in go